Balad may refer to:

Places
 Balad, Iran
 Bir-e Bala or Bālād, Konarak, Iran
 Balad, Iraq
Balad Air Base, Iraq
 Balad District, Iraq
 Joint Base Balad, Iraq
 Al-Balad, Jeddah, Saudi Arabia
 Balad, Somalia
 Balad District, Somalia

Other uses
 Balad (political party), an Arab-Israeli political party
 Al-Balad (newspaper), a defunct newspaper in Lebanon

See also
 Al-Balad
 Balat (Istanbul), Turkey, Istanbul's traditional Jewish quarter
 Balada (disambiguation)
 Ballad (disambiguation)

Ballard Estate in Mumbai,India.